Datuk Fatimah binti Abdul Majid was one of the founders of the establishment and fight another UMNO since 1946. She and other members of the campaign day and night in the interior of a bike ride, boat and on foot to meet people to find support and influence.

In the general election of Malaya in 1959 she won and was elected as the first woman to be a member of the Johor State Legislative Assembly. Malaysia's 1964 general election she won and became the first woman elected to the Johor state of Malaysia Parliament. The next she was winning until the 1978 Malaysian general election.

She founded and established the Territorial Army Women's team in 1964. While the country is facing tough scenario the Indonesia-Malaysia confrontation.

On 27 November 2008 she was awarded the Panglima Jasa Negara (PJN) which carries the title Datuk by the Yang di-Pertuan Agong, Sultan Mizan Zainal Abidin at Istana Negara. She died on 12 April 2013 at the National Heart Institute (IJN) due to old age.

References

2013 deaths
Year of birth missing
Malaysian Muslims
Malaysian people of Malay descent
United Malays National Organisation politicians
Malaysian women's rights activists
Members of the Dewan Rakyat
Women members of the Dewan Rakyat
Members of the Johor State Legislative Assembly
Women MLAs in Johor
Companions of the Order of the Defender of the Realm
Commanders of the Order of Meritorious Service
20th-century Malaysian women politicians
20th-century Malaysian politicians